State Road 994 (SR 994), locally known as Quail Roost Drive, is an  east–west four-lane road in southern Miami-Dade County, Florida area. It connects Krome Avenue (SR 997) with U.S. Route 1.

Route description
It heads east as Quail Roost Drive, or Southwest 200th Street, an undivided two-lane road through farmland, crossing CSX tracks after . After continuing east for another , SR 994 reaches Southwest 137th Avenue and enters suburbia. Upon crossing the Black Creek Canal  later, Quail Roost Drive enters the community of South Miami Heights, and soon reaches Southwest 127th Avenue where it expands to four lanes. After the intersection, SR 994 turns to the northeast and continues on this trajectory for the next , losing the Southwest 200th Street designation, and passing through a residential neighbourhood and shopping district. As it turns back to the east, SR 994 has an interchange with the Homestead Extension of Florida's Turnpike, passing beneath it, before picking up the Southwest 186th Street designation as it leaves South Miami Heights while crossing another canal. Afterwards, Quail Roost Drive passes through a mixture of commercial and light industrial uses, before crossing the South Miami-Dade Busway, forming the boundary between Cutler Bay and West Perrine's south-eastern corner. One block later, SR 994 terminates at US 1, the South Dixie Highway.

From SR 994's western terminus, Southwest 200th Street continues on through farmland in two segments, one from SR 994's terminus to Southwest 187th Street as a two-laned road, and again from just east of Southwest 194th Avenue to Southwest 207th Avenue, just east of the Aerojet canal, as an unmarked rural street and in some places little more than a gravel road. East of the SR 994 terminus, Southwest 186th Street continues on for several blocks into Cutler Bay to terminate at Southwest 97th Street.

History
From 1980 to 1983 (when the Florida Department of Transportation reallocated route numbers in a statewide reorganization), Quail Roost Drive was designated State Road 974.

Major intersections

See also

References

994
994
1983 establishments in Florida